Bambusa binghamii is a species of Bambusa bamboo.

Distribution 
Bambusa binghamii is native to Southern Myanmar.

Description 
Bambusa binghamii is membranous, veined and ciliate. There are 6 stamen with its tips smooth. There are 3 smooth stigmas.

References 

binghamii
Flora of Myanmar